Manifesto of Nevermore is a greatest hits compilation by the heavy metal band Nevermore. It contains tracks from the first six Nevermore albums as well as their In Memory EP in reverse chronological order except one song taken from their double DVD/CD live album The Year of the Voyager released in 2008 as the last track on the compilation. It was released in Europe and the UK on March 2, 2009.

Track listing

Personnel
Warrel Dane – lead vocals
Jeff Loomis – lead guitar
Pat O'Brien – guitar (Tracks 9-12) 
Tim Calvert – guitar  (Tracks 7-8) 
Steve Smyth – guitar  (Tracks: 1-2) 
Chris Broderick – guitar  (Track 13) 
Jim Sheppard – bass
Van Williams – drums

External links
Nevermore Official website

2009 greatest hits albums
Nevermore albums
Century Media Records compilation albums